Antaeotricha cycnomorpha is a moth in the family Depressariidae. It was described by Edward Meyrick in 1925. It is found in Brazil.

References

Moths described in 1925
cycnomorpha
Taxa named by Edward Meyrick
Moths of South America